= British Expeditionary Force =

British Expeditionary Force (BEF) may refer to:

- British Expeditionary Force (World War I), the British field force sent to France in World War I
- British Expeditionary Force (World War II), the British field force sent to France in World War II
